Rahul Sharma (born 25 September 1972) is an Indian music director and Indian classical santoor player.  The santoor is a folk instrument.

Early life
Rahul Sharma was born in Mumbai to the Dogra family of Santoor player Pt. Shivkumar Sharma and Manorama, from a family steeped in the tradition of Jammu and Kashmir. His grandfather, Uma Dutt Sharma, was a santoor player. Married to his sweetheart Barkha Sharma in 2009. The couple have a son named Abhinav born on 17 June 2014.

Career
Rahul started playing the harmonium at an early age. Learning the santoor at age 13, he wasn't completely sure of pursuing music until he turned 17. After studying economics at Mumbai's Mithibai College, Rahul Sharma began performing with his father. He started accompanying him in concerts in 1996, at the age of 24.

At the age of 22, Sharma was signed by Peter Gabriel to perform at WOMAD and at the Darbar festival.

Having learnt from his father Shivkumar Sharma, Rahul has taken the santoor into world music with various collaborations, including Namaste India.

Rahul and American saxophonist Kenny G's album reached #2 on Billboard world charts and #4 on Board Smooth jazz charts.

Rahul also collaborated with Grammy-winning electronica group Deep Forest, founded by Eric Miquet on 10 tracks which combined Indian folk and santoor with electronica.

Rahul has also experimented by taking the santoor into the rock genre with his album The Rebel.

Rahul Sharma has been awarded the Sangeet Natak Akademi award.

He has released several CDs, some solo and some with his father. He has collaborated with international musicians such as pianist Richard Clayderman and keyboardist Kersi Lord. The Confluence (2002) has mostly Indian titles, six of which were composed by Rahul himself. He provided the music for the Hindi feature film Mujhse Dosti Karoge, for which he received the award in the "Best Debut - Music Director" category at the 2002 ZEE Bollywood Music Awards. Time Traveler, which has been described as New Age, was released on 10 March 2006. Amitabh Bachchan is the singer of Rahul's latest composition titled ‘ Jai Hanuman’ from Kunal Kohli's web series Ramyug on MX player Feat - Ustad Zakir Hussain.

He also collaborated with such musicians as Zakir Hussain, John McLaughlin, Mickey Hart, George Harrison, Yo Yo Ma, Joe Henderson, Van Morrison, Airto Moreira, Pharoah Sanders, and the Kodo Drummers.

During the Royal visit by the Duke and Duchess of Cambridge Prince William and Kate Middleton, Rahul Sharma and his wife had played various songs by The Beatles, including "Norwegian Wood", "O Sweet Lord" and "Let It Be".

In 2019, he and his father along with Yogesh Samsi had performed at the Barbican Centre.

Rahul Sharma has more than 60 Albums to his credit

Awards and accolades
Sangeet Natak Akademi Awards (2011)
MTV IMMIES Best Instrumental Album - ZEN 2001

References

External links

Aga Khan Music Initiative in Central Asia

1972 births
Living people
Dogra people
Hindustani instrumentalists
Musicians from Mumbai
Santoor players
Mithibai College alumni
Dogra